Chilca District is one of sixteen districts of the province Cañete in Peru. The archaeological site of Paloma is located in this district, on the northern edge of the Chilca River's valley.

References